Conflict Resolver is an application used by Apple's sync services.  Data can be synced between services like MobileMe and Gmail to devices like Macs, PCs, and mobile devices.  The sync services are utilized by several applications including Address Book, iCal, Mail.  Conflict Resolver is executed in the event that a sync service cannot decide on which version of the data to use, creating a conflict. The user is prompted to choose which version of the data to use (MobileMe or local) and whether the user wishes to apply the same changes to all conflicts or review them individually. 

Conflict Resolver resides at:
 in versions of Mac OS X since 10.5.

External links
 MobileMe

MacOS-only software made by Apple Inc.
MacOS